Hypoxia up-regulated protein 1 is a protein that in humans is encoded by the HYOU1 gene.

The protein encoded by this gene belongs to the heat shock protein 70 family. This gene has three mRNAs from the use of alternative transcription sites. A cis-acting segment is found at the 5' end of exon 1A which is involved in the stress-dependent induction. The transcript that begins with exon 1B is preferentially induced by hypoxia, resulting in the accumulation of this protein in the endoplasmic reticulum (ER). 

The protein encoded by this gene is thought to play an important role in protein folding and secretion in the ER. Since suppression of the protein is associated with accelerated apoptosis, it is also suggested to have an important cytoprotective role in hypoxia-induced cellular perturbation. This protein has been shown to be up-regulated in tumors, especially in breast tumors, and thus it is associated with tumor invasiveness. 

There is also an alternative translation site of this gene which lacks the signal peptide. This signal peptide-lacking protein, is only 3 amino acids shorter than the mature protein in the ER, and it is thought to have a housekeeping function in the cytosol.

References

Further reading